Magliophis stahli, the Puerto Rican miniracer, is a species of snake in the family Colubridae.  The species is native to Puerto Rico.

References

Magliophis
Snakes of North America
Endemic fauna of Puerto Rico
Reptiles of Puerto Rico
Reptiles described in 1904
Taxa named by Leonhard Stejneger